Ú, ú (u-acute) is a Latin letter used in the Czech, Faroese, Hungarian, Icelandic, and Slovak writing systems. This letter also appears in Dutch, Frisian, Irish, Occitan, Pinyin, Portuguese, Spanish, Italian, Galician, and Vietnamese as a variant of the letter "U".

Usage in various languages

Czech
Ú/ú is the 34th letter of the Czech alphabet and represents a  sound. It is always the first letter of the word except in compound words, such as "trojúhelník" triangle, which is composed of two words: "troj", which is derived from "tři" three, and "úhel", which means angle. If this sound is in the middle of the word, letter Ů is used instead.

Faroese
Ú/ú is the 24th letter of the Faroese alphabet, and may represent the following sounds:
 Short  in such words as krúss  ("mug", "coffee cup")
 Short  before  in such words as kúgv  ("cow"), but also in brúdleyp  ("bridal")
 Long  diphthong in úti  ("out"), hús  ("house"), jú  ("but"),

Hungarian
Ú/ú is the 36th letter of the Hungarian alphabet and represents a  sound.

Icelandic
Ú/ú is the 25th letter of the Icelandic alphabet, and represents a  sound.

Kazakh

It was proposed in 2018 that Ú/ú should be one of its Latin script, it should represent the near-close front rounded vowel and is used to replace Cyrillic Ү. The replacement is modified to be Ü ü in 2020.

Slovak
Ú/ú is the 39th letter of the Slovak alphabet and represents a  sound.

Portuguese/Spanish
In Portuguese and Spanish, the "ú" is not a letter but the letter "u" with an accent. It is used to denote an "u" syllable with abnormal stress.

Italian
Ú/ú is a variant of U carrying an acute accent; it represents an /u/ carrying the tonic accent. It is used only if it is the last letter of the word except in dictionaries.

Character encoding

See also
 Acute accent

U-acute